The 1980 Men's Hockey Champions Trophy was the 2nd edition of the Hockey Champions Trophy, an international men's field hockey tournament. It took place from 3–11 January 1980 in Karachi, Pakistan.

Results

Final standings

External links
Official FIH website

Champions Trophy (field hockey)
Champions Trophy
Hockey Champions Trophy
International field hockey competitions hosted by Pakistan
Sport in Karachi
20th century in Karachi
Men's Hockey Champions Trophy